In enzymology, a 4-hydroxybenzoate polyprenyltransferase is an enzyme that catalyzes the chemical reaction

a polyprenyl diphosphate + 4-hydroxybenzoate  diphosphate + a 4-hydroxy-3-polyprenylbenzoate

Thus, the two substrates of this enzyme are a polyprenyl diphosphate and 4-hydroxybenzoate, whereas its two products are diphosphate and 4-hydroxy-3-polyprenylbenzoate.

This enzyme belongs to the family of transferases, specifically those transferring aryl or alkyl groups other than methyl groups.  This enzyme participates in ubiquinone biosynthesis.

Nomenclature 
The systematic name of this enzyme class is polyprenyl-diphosphate:4-hydroxybenzoate polyprenyltransferase. Other names in common use include:
 nonaprenyl-4-hydroxybenzoate transferase,
 4-hydroxybenzoate transferase, 
 p-hydroxybenzoate dimethylallyltransferase, 
 p-hydroxybenzoate polyprenyltransferase, 
 p-hydroxybenzoic acid-polyprenyl transferase, 
 p-hydroxybenzoic-polyprenyl transferase, and 
 4-hydroxybenzoate nonaprenyltransferase

References

 

EC 2.5.1
Enzymes of unknown structure